Grzegorz Leon Kotowicz (born 6 August 1973 in Czechowice-Dziedzice) is a Polish sprint canoer who competed from the early 1990s to the early 2000s (decade). In his career, Kotowicz garnered two Olympic medals, eight World Championship medals, and five European Championship medals.

For his sport achievements, he received: 
 Golden Cross of Merit in 2000.

Summer Olympics
Competing in three Summer Olympics, he won two bronze medals. Kotowicz won them in the K-2 1000 m in 1992 and in the K-4 1000 m in 2000.

World championships
Kotowicz won eight medals at the ICF Canoe Sprint World Championships with three silvers (K-1 200 m: 1997, K-1 500 m: 1997, K-4 1000 m: 1994) and five bronzes (K-1 500 m: 1999, K-2 1000 m: 1995, 1997; K-4 500 m: 1995, K-4 1000 m: 1995).

European Championships
Kotowicz won three silver medals at the 1997 European Championship (K-1 200 m, K-1 500 m, K-2 1000 m). At the 1999 edition, he won gold in the K-4 1000 m event with teammates Białkowski, Seroczyński and Witkowski. Kotowicz also won silver in the K-1 500 m event at those same championships.

Post-Competition Career
On 8 January 2005 Grzegorz Kotowicz was appointed to the International Canoe Federation (ICF) Athletes Commission.[1]

References
ICF Athletes Commission appointed
DatabaseOlympics.com profile

Pkol.pl profile 

1973 births
Canoeists at the 1992 Summer Olympics
Canoeists at the 1996 Summer Olympics
Canoeists at the 2000 Summer Olympics
Living people
Olympic canoeists of Poland
Olympic bronze medalists for Poland
People from Czechowice-Dziedzice
Polish male canoeists
Olympic medalists in canoeing
ICF Canoe Sprint World Championships medalists in kayak
Sportspeople from Silesian Voivodeship
Medalists at the 2000 Summer Olympics
Medalists at the 1992 Summer Olympics